Nooaitch First Nation is a Nlaka'pamux First Nations government in the Southern Interior region of British Columbia, Canada. It is a member of the Scw’exmx Tribal Council.

The Nooaitch First Nation reserve community and offices are located in Merritt. The main urban centre is in the Nicola Country region between the Lower Mainland and Kamloops. It has a population of 235 people.

Chief and Councillors

Chief Marcel Shackelly, 
Councillor Neil Shackelly, 
Councillor James Fountain.

Treaty Process

History

Demographics

Economic Development
In 2007 the band signed a Forest and Range Opportunity Agreement with the Government of British Columbia that allowed the band to apply for a license to harvest 20,000 m3 of mountain pine beetle-infested timber annually over a 5-year period within the traditional territory of the Nooaitch Indian Band.

Programs and facilities

Reserves

The band has jurisdiction over the following two reserves:

 Nooaitch Grass 9
 Nooaitch 10

See also
Nicola (chief)
Scw'exmx
Thompson language

References

External links 
Indian and Northern Affairs Canada - First Nation Detail

Nlaka'pamux governments
Nicola Country